Jed is a masculine given name or nickname, usually of Jedediah.

People

Politicians
 Jed Johnson (Oklahoma) (1888–1963), politician from Oklahoma
 Jed Johnson, Jr. (1939–1993), U.S. Representative from Oklahoma, son of Jed Johnson

In sports
 Jed Adcock (born 1985), Australian rules footballer
 Jed Anderson (born 1994), Australian rules footballer
 Jed Bews (born 1993), Australian rules footballer
 Jed Brown (born 1991), New Zealand rugby union player
 Jedidiah Jed Collins (born 1986), American National Football League player
 Jed Graef (born 1942), American swimmer and Olympic gold medalist
 Jed Hansen (born 1972), American Major League Baseball player
 Jed Holloway (born 1992), Australian rugby union footballer
 Jed Hoyer (born 1973), American executive vice-president and general manager of the Chicago Cubs Major League Baseball team
 Jed Hughes, American college football and National Football League coach
 Jadwiga Jędrzejowska (1912–1980), Polish tennis player nicknamed "Jed"
 Jed Jones, American tennis player, semifinalist in the 1906 US Open
 Jed Lamb (born 1992), Australian rules footballer
 Jed Lowrie (born 1984), American Major League Baseball player
 Jed Metcher (born 1990), Australian Grand Prix motorcycle racer
 Jed Ortmeyer (born 1978), American National Hockey League player
 Jed Prentice, American slalom canoer, world champion in 1989 and 1991
 Jed Roberts (born 1967), Canadian Football League player
 Jed Rowlands, New Zealand rugby union coach
 Jed Steer (born 1992), English football goalkeeper
 Jed Wallace (born 1994), English footballer 
 Jed Weaver (born 1976), American National Football League player
 John Edward Jed York (born c. 1980), American CEO of the San Francisco 49ers National Football League team
 Jedidiah Jed Zayner (born 1984), American soccer player

In arts and entertainment
 Jed Allan (1935–2019), American actor, particularly on soap operas
 Jed Brophy (born 1963), New Zealand film actor
 Jed Harris (1900–1979), Austrian-American theater producer and director and film writer born Jacob Hirsch Horowitz
 Jed Johnson (designer) (1948–1996), American interior designer and lover of Andy Warhol
 Jed Kurzel (born 1976), Australian film composer and musician
 Jed Mercurio (born 1966), British television writer, producer and director and novelist
 Jed Perl (born 1951), American art critic and author
 Jed Prouty (1879–1956), American film actor
 Jed Riffe, American filmmaker
 Jed Simon (born 1964), Canadian musician
 Jed Whedon (born 1974), American screenwriter and musician

Academics
 Jed Buchwald, American historian, professor of history at Caltech
 Jed Rubenfeld, American Yale Law School professor and author

Other
 Jed S. Rakoff (born 1943), American federal judge
 Jed Smock, also known as Brother Jed (born 1943), confrontational American evangelist and campus preacher

Fictional characters
 Josiah Bartlet ("Jed"), on the American television series The West Wing
 Jed Clampett, on the American television series The Beverly Hillbillies
 Jedediah Leland ("Jed"), reporter in the film Citizen Kane
 Jemima Marshall ("Jed") (female), in John le Carrés novel The Night Manager and on the British TV mini-series of the same name
 Jed Olsen, the alias of Danny Johnson, who is The Ghost Face in the multiplatform video game Dead by Daylight
 Jed Stone, on the British soap opera Coronation Street
 Jed Wright, the only boss in the Xbox 360 video game demo Dead Rising 2: Case Zero

See also
Jedd, given name

References

Lists of people by nickname